Adine Riom, née Alexandrine Louise Claudine Broband (25 October 1818, in Le Pellerin – 28 August 1899, in Nantes) was a French writer, poetess, and playwright.

Life 
Alexandrine Broband was born in Le Pellerin on 25 October 1818. She was a daughter of Louis Broband, a bodyguard of Napoleon Bonaparte’s sister Pauline. At the age of 22, she married the Nantes notary Alexandre Eugene Riom and moved to a private mansion in Nantes, Boulevard Delorme. At her home, Riom held a literary salon that attracted many regional writers such as Joseph Rousse, Émile Péhant, Eugène Lambert, Eugène Manuel, Émile Blin, Honoré Broutelle, Louis Tiercelin and Olivier de Courcuff.

She published several volumes of poetry under the pennames Count of Saint-Jean or Louise d'Isole. Her poetry was received with great success by the critics of the time, including Victor Hugo and Lamartine. Except for poetry Riom wrote three novels. She collaborated with numerous literary magazines such as La France littéraire, La Revue contemporain, and La Revue de Bretagne et de Vendée. Riom also participated in drafting an anthology of Breton poets of the 17th century published in 1884.

Adine Riom died on 28 August 1899 in Nantes.

Adine Riom Cultural Space in Le Pellerin, France was opened in her name recently.

Works

Novels 

 Le serment, ou La Chapelle de Bethléem; A. Guéraud, 1855
 Mobiles et zouaves bretons, 1871
 Michel Marion, épisode de la guerre de l'indépendance bretonne, 1879

Poetry and Theater Plays 

 Oscar, poème, Nantes, 1850
 Reflets de la lumière; E. Dentu et A. Guéraud, 1857
 Flux et reflux, par le comte de Saint-Jean; E. Dentu & A. Guéraud, 1859
 Passion, 1864
Après l'amour, sous le pseudonyme Louise d'Isole. Préface de Eugène Loudun; A. Lemerre, 1867
Merlin; A. Lemerre, 1872
Histoires et légendes bretonnes, 1873
Salomon et la reine de Saba, légende orientale, 1873
Fleurs du passé, 1880
Légendes bibliques et orientales, 1882
Les Adieux, poésies bretonnes. Préface d'Eugène Manuel; A. Lemerre, 1895
Les Oiseaux des tournelles
Les femmes poètes bretonnes
Le Chêne, rêve signé Louise d’Isole; Nantes, 1880

Anthology 

 Anthologie des poètes bretons du 17me siècle, Nantes, 1884

References 

1818 births
1899 deaths
19th-century French poets
19th-century French women writers
French women poets